The Changwon Football Centre Stadium is a football-specific stadium and training ground in Changwon, South Korea. It is currently used mostly for football matches. The stadium holds 15,074 people. It was built in 2009

Currently, it is the home ground of the K League 2 side Gyeongnam FC and the K3 League side Changwon City FC.

Gallery

See also
 Changwon Sports Park

References

External links
 Changwon Football Center Official website 
 Changwon Football Center Official website 

Football venues in South Korea
Sports venues in Changwon
Gyeongnam FC
Sports venues completed in 2009
K League 1 stadiums
K League 2 stadiums